Google PowerMeter was a software project of Google's philanthropic arm, Google.org, to help consumers track their home electricity usage. The development of the software was part of an effort by Google to invest in renewable energy, electricity grid upgrades, and other measures that would reduce greenhouse gas emissions. It was launched on October 5, 2009 and ended on September 16, 2011.

The software was designed to record the user's electricity usage in near real-time. According to the company, if half of America's homes' energy use was cut by ten percent, it would equal the average energy used by eight million cars.

It was hoped that this tool would raise the home-owner's awareness of how much energy they use and make users more energy efficient. PowerMeter was intended for use with smart meters able to track electricity usage in more detail than standard electric meters. According to Google, in 2009 there were approximately 40 million smart meters in use worldwide. By early 2009, approximately 7% of US homes had a smart meter installed.

Some other types of electricity meters and in-home energy use displays could also be used with PowerMeter.

Partnerships 
In May 2009, Google announced that it had partners with smart meter maker Itron. In October 2009 Google PowerMeter announced their first "device partner", The Energy Detective (TED 5000), an energy monitor from Energy Inc then only available only in North America, and their first UK partnership which was with AlertMe. Also in 2009, Yello Strom customers in Germany were able to begin adding the PowerMeter widget to their iGoogle pages to track their energy usage.

In 2010 UK company Current Cost announced a collaboration with Google PowerMeter. San Diego Gas and Electric's Sempra Energy company announced plans to install 1.4 million smart meters in San Diego County and Southern Orange County by the end of 2011 and said that after they sent out 100,000 post cards to let consumers know they could use the Google PowerMeter service, about 6% had started to use it.

In June 2011 Google announced the service would cease.

See also
 Google Energy
 Cent-a-meter
 Energy management software
 Hohm
 Kill A Watt
 Nonintrusive load monitoring

References

External links
PowerMeter official site 

PowerMeter
Electricity meters